Christopher Wight (born 3 July 1959) is a former cricketer from the Cayman Islands. A wicket-keeper, he played for the Cayman Islands national cricket team from 2000 to 2004.

Career

Wight made his debut for the Cayman Islands in August 2000 when he played against the USA and Bermuda in the Americas Championship at the Maple Leaf Cricket Club in King City, Ontario. Later in the year, he played in four List A matches as part of the Red Stripe Bowl in Antigua. His other two international tournaments were the 2002 Americas Championship in Buenos Aires and the 2004 Americas Championship in Bermuda.

Family

Christopher's parents are Derek and Marguerite Wight. He has four brothers (Brian, his twin David, Michael and Philip) and five sisters (Sandra, Deborah, Ann- Marie, Wendy and Jennifer). He came from a cricketing family. His twin brother David also played cricket for the Cayman Islands, as did two other brothers; Michael and Philip. His grandfather Oscar played for British Guiana, and his great-uncle Vibart played Test cricket for the West Indies.

References

1959 births
Living people
Caymanian cricketers
Caymanian twins
Twin sportspeople